The Executive Council of Manitoba, more commonly known as the Cabinet of Manitoba, is the cabinet of the Canadian province of Manitoba. As of 2023, the current cabinet are members of the Progressive Conservatives, and have been since 2016.

Almost always made up of members of the Legislative Assembly of Manitoba, the Cabinet is similar in structure and role to the Cabinet of Canada while being smaller in size. As federal and provincial responsibilities differ, there are a number of different portfolios between the federal and provincial governments.

The Lieutenant-Governor of Manitoba, as representative of the King in Right of Manitoba, heads the council, and is referred to as the Governor-in-Council. Other members of the Cabinet, who advise (or minister) the vice-regal, are selected by the Premier of Manitoba and appointed by the Lieutenant-Governor. Most cabinet ministers are the head of a ministry, but this is not always the case.

Current cabinet

References

External links
Legislative Assembly of Manitoba: Cabinet Ministers